April Flowers is a 2017 American romantic comedy film written and directed by Christopher Tedrick and starring Celina Jade, Keir Dullea, and Wai Ching Ho.

External links
 Official Site
 
 

2017 films
American romantic comedy films
Films set in New York City
2017 romantic comedy films
2010s English-language films
2010s American films